Viglione is a surname. Notable people with the surname include:

Brian Viglione (born 1979), American musician
Lou Viglione, NASCAR team owner
Theresa Viglione, Italian and South African woman
Mike Viglione (Ubiquitous), American rapper, one half of the rap duo Ces Cru

See also
Doctor Atilio Oscar Viglione, village and municipality in Argentina